"Keep On Pushing" is a 1964 single by The Impressions, and was the title track of the album of the same name.

Chart history
The single became the group's sixth Top 40 single, and a Top 10 Pop smash, peaking at number ten. It went to number one for two weeks on the Cash Box R&B chart.

Use in presidential campaigns
Decades later, the song was used as the theme to the 2004 Democratic National Convention keynote address by then-Illinois State Senator Barack Obama, who endorsed U.S. Senator John Kerry for President. 
It was frequently played at rallies in the early days of the 2020 presidential campaign of Joe Biden.

Popular culture
The title was mentioned in-between the lyrics, by Curtis Mayfield in the Impressions rendition of the Negro Spiritual "Amen". (1964). 
The album (cover) is one of several featured on the front cover art of the Bob Dylan's 1965 album Bringing It All Back Home.
It was featured in the 1995 film Dead Presidents.
It was also heard in the 2021 biographical drama Judas and the Black Messiah.

Samples
It was sampled in the 2005 song "Pushin'" by Bun B featuring Scarface and Young Jeezy, off the album Trill.

See also
 Civil rights movement in popular culture

References

1964 singles
The Impressions songs
1964 songs
Civil rights movement in popular culture
Songs written by Curtis Mayfield